Sancti Spíritus won its only Cuban National Series in 1979, edging Villa Clara and Vegueros to win the league with an impressive 39–12 record.

Standings

References

 (Note - text is printed in a white font on a white background, depending on browser used.)

Cuban National Series seasons
Base
Base
1979 in baseball